Boehlkea fredcochui, also known as the Cochu's blue tetra is a species of characin. Its natural range is in the Amazon Basin. It is commonly kept as an aquarium fish.

The fish is named in honor of tropical fish importer Ferdinand (Fred) Cochu of the Paramount Aquarium, who introduced this species to the aquarium hobby around 1956.

Aquarium Care

 Maximum length: 
 Colors: Blue, pink
 Temperature preference: 22-27 Celsius (71-80 Fahrenheit) 
 pH preference: 6 to 7.5 
 Hardness preference: Soft to medium (less than 15ºd)
 Salinity preference: No salt
 Compatibility: Generally peaceful, may nip fins during feeding or when stressed
 Life span: Typically 2 to 3 years  
 Ease of keeping: Easy 
 Ease of breeding: Moderate to hard

As for other schooling characins, the cochu's blue tetra should always be kept in groups of at least six. A very active fish, it requires open areas in which to swim and is best kept in aquariums  or larger. Aggression is generally limited to conspecifics in appropriate setups, but they may harass other fish in too small a tank, or without enough other tetras.

Spawning may occur in home setups, with the eggs being scattered over fine leafed plants. Soft, acidic water is required for hatching to occur. Males may be differentiated from females by their slimmer, more streamlined form and more intense colouration.

References

Characidae
Freshwater fish of Brazil
Freshwater fish of Colombia
Freshwater fish of Peru
Fish of the Amazon basin
Taxa named by Jacques Géry
Fish described in 1966